The Northeast Florida Regional Transportation Commission (NEFRTC) is a regional transportation agency of the U.S. state of Florida. Established June 14, 2013, the purpose of the agency is to coordinate and advance the planning, project development and implementation of regional transportation facilities and services in Baker, Clay, Duval, Nassau, Putnam, and St. Johns Counties.

See also

 Transportation in Jacksonville, Florida
 Jacksonville Transportation Authority

References

External links
 Official website

Transportation in Jacksonville, Florida
Transportation in Baker County, Florida
Transportation in Clay County, Florida
Transportation in Duval County, Florida
Transportation in Nassau County, Florida
Transportation in Putnam County, Florida
Transportation in St. Johns County, Florida
Intermodal transportation authorities in Florida
Government in the Jacksonville metropolitan area
2013 establishments in Florida